Hajja is a settlement in western coastal Morocco near Rabat.  The earliest recorded history of the general vicinity is associated with the now ruined Chellah along the estuarine portion of the Oued Bou Regreg.  Chellah was originally settled by the Phoenicians and later became a Roman settlement.

See also
Chellah

References

Populated places in Rabat-Salé-Kénitra